The Château de Launac is a 15th-century castle in the commune of Launac in the Haute-Garonne département of France. Major additions and alterations were made in the 16th and 17th centuries. Privately owned, the upper floor and the corner tower have been listed since 1927 as a monument historique by the French Ministry of Culture. The rest of the castle was listed in 1991.

See also
List of castles in France

References

External links
 

Castles in Haute-Garonne
Monuments historiques of Haute-Garonne